List of committees of the Northern Ireland Assembly is a list of departmental, standing and ad hoc committees of the Northern Ireland Assembly.

Departmental committees 
 Executive Office
 Agriculture, Environment and Rural Affairs
 Communities
 Economy
 Education
 Finance
 Health
 Infrastructure
 Justice

Standing committees 
 Assembly and Executive Review Committee
 Committee on Procedures
 Business Committee
 Public Accounts Committee
 Committee on Standards and Privileges
 Audit Committee

See also 
 List of government departments, their agencies and their ministers in Northern Ireland

References

External links 
 Northern Ireland Assembly

Northern Ireland Assembly
Northern Ireland Assembly, Committees